The Leighton Hill is a high end private luxury housing estate in Leighton Hill, Happy Valley, Hong Kong. It is an upmarket residential development located in Happy Valley that overlooks the Happy Valley Racecourse & neighboring Caroline Hill. Large scale high-rise blocks such as these are rare in the area, adding to the prestige of these buildings. Higher floor units include balconies while those on the bottom floor are allocated private garden spaces. The two central towers are taller with an impressive internal ceiling height that ranges between 3.4-3.6m per floor. Ceilings in other blocks stand at 3.15m.

Formerly Leighton Hill Government Quarters and Harcourt Place, the estate consists of 8 high-rise buildings with a total of 544 units developed by Sun Hung Kai Properties in 2002. It also includes a public community hall managed by Home Affairs Department.

Price range 
Prices range from 70 Million HKD to 300 Million HKD (US$9 Million to US$38 Million) per flat. (More info on https://www.okay.com/en/building/the-leighton-hill/843 ,http://midland.com.hk, http://hk.centanet.com/)

Median Price per Square Feet: HKD 42.38k/SQ.FT, US$5.5k/SQ.FT

Median Rent: HKD 180k/Month, US$23k/Month

Residents 
Many celebrities, high net worth individuals, CEOs, Principal Officials of the Hong Kong are the residents of the estate, including Adam Cheng, a veteran actor in TVB, Rafael Hui, former Chief Secretary for Administration of Hong Kong, and Paul Chan, Financial Secretary of Hong Kong.

References

External links
Official website of The Leighton Hill

Residential buildings completed in 2002
Private housing estates in Hong Kong
Sun Hung Kai Properties
Happy Valley, Hong Kong
2002 establishments in Hong Kong